Laurent Béteille (born 19 April 1948 in Nîmes) is a former member of the Senate of France, who represented the Essonne department.  He is a member of the Union for a Popular Movement.

References
Page on the Senate website

1948 births
Living people
People from Nîmes
Rally for the Republic politicians
Union for a Popular Movement politicians
Gaullism, a way forward for France
French Senators of the Fifth Republic
Senators of Essonne